Caitriona Jennings (born 17 June 1980; from Letterkenny, County Donegal)  is an Irish long distance runner who competed in the marathon at the 2012 Summer Olympics in London, United Kingdom.

Early life

Jennings attended Loreto Convent Secondary School, Letterkenny, and went on to study Law and Accountancy at the University of Limerick before taking up a job as a tax advisor with PricewaterhouseCoopers in Dublin. She is the sister of Irish international rower and Rio 2016 Olympian Sinead Jennings.

Athletics

Jennings is a former triathlete who represented Ireland at youth level. Since moving to Dublin she has trained with the Rathfarnham club and has been coached by Terry McConnon since 2007. In December 2009 became involved with the Marathon Mission squad and in 2010 she won the Dublin Mini-Marathon. She ran her first marathon in Dublin in October 2011.

2012

Jennings achieved 'A' qualifying standard for the 2012 Olympics with a personal best time of two hours, 36 minutes and 14 seconds at the 2012 Rotterdam Marathon. Having taken two months off of work to train full-time for Rotterdam, and competing in just her second full marathon, her qualifying time was an improvement of nearly seven minutes from her first marathon.

Jennings was selected to represent Ireland at the 2012 Summer Olympics in the women's marathon along with Linda Byrne and Ava Hutchinson. Maria McCambridge, who had also run the 'A' qualifying standard missed out on selection as only three athletes from a nation may compete in the event. It was the first time that three Irish women have competed in the Olympic marathon.

In June she won the Newry half marathon in a time of one hour, 15 minutes and 25 seconds.

Suffering from plantar fasciitis and a stress fracture, Jennings finished last in the marathon at the 2012 Olympics in a time of 3:22:11, an hour behind winner Tiki Gelana.

2021

Jennings won third place in the women's full marathon in the 2021 Hong Kong Standard Chartered Marathon, with a finishing time of 2:51:31.

References 

1980 births
Living people
People from Letterkenny
Sportspeople from Dublin (city)
Irish female long-distance runners
Olympic athletes of Ireland
Athletes (track and field) at the 2012 Summer Olympics
Alumni of the University of Limerick
PricewaterhouseCoopers people
Sportspeople from County Donegal